Claudio Paul Caniggia (born 9 January 1967) is an Argentine former professional footballer who played as forward or winger. Caniggia played 50 times for the Argentina national team. He appeared in three World Cups, and was a member of both rival clubs River Plate and Boca Juniors. 

At the 1990 FIFA World Cup, Caniggia scored two goals to help Argentina reach the final but was suspended for the final against West Germany.

Caniggia also scored two goals at the 1994 FIFA World Cup in a first-round match against Nigeria.

As well as appearing for River Plate and Boca Juniors, his other clubs include Atalanta, Benfica, Dundee and Rangers. Throughout his playing career, he played for clubs in Argentina, Italy, Portugal, Scotland, Qatar and England.

Club career
At club level, Caniggia played for River Plate (1985–88), Hellas Verona (1988–89), Atalanta (1989–92 and 1999–2000), Roma (1992–93), S.L. Benfica (1994–95), Boca Juniors (1995–98), Dundee (2000–01) and Rangers (2001–03). He has become a club legend and cult-hero at many of the clubs he has played at, for instance when scoring against Dunfermline in 2003 to help Rangers win the title.

In 1988, Caniggia moved to Serie A club Hellas Verona after accumulating 53 appearances and 8 goals for River Plate. He then moved to Atalanta in 1989, where he would remain for three years and score 26 goals in 85 league games. With Atalanta, he competed twice in the UEFA Cup, helping the club reach the quarter-finals in the 1990–91 edition. Despite not winning any silverware, Caniggia later described his experience with Atalanta as "the best years in his career".

Caniggia moved to Roma in 1992, a move both parties believed would help the club aim for the Scudetto, though Roma lost its momentum mid-season with only 15 points from 17 games. After a 1–1 draw against Napoli on 21 March 1993, following a surprise doping test, Caniggia was handed a 13-month ban for taking cocaine; he has a history of enjoying the high life. After his ban expired, he joined Benfica on a year-long loan financed by the Parmalat dairy company. During his Benfica run, Valencia contacted him. He played with the white kit during a friendly match where Valencia faced Brazil in Mestalla. He played as a guest player in a team where Tenerife player Diego Latorre was also included in the squad. Valencia had to pay 80 million pesetas for the inclusion of both players for that friendly, receiving only 66 million in ticket sales.

Argentine media mogul Eduardo Eurnekian then acquired the rights to Caniggia from Roma and Diego Maradona from Racing Club de Avellaneda, loaning them to Boca Juniors in exchange for matches played on his television stations. At the completion of his one-year contract, Caniggia's outspoken wife refused to return to Argentina and he was heavily linked with clubs in England. In September 1996 his mother committed suicide by jumping from the fifth floor of her building and Caniggia did not play in the 1996–97 season. He returned to play for Boca in 1997–98 but his appearances were sporadic as he missed out on the 1998 World Cup squad. After another season of inactivity he re-joined Atalanta in Serie B, helping the club achieve promotion to Serie A, but left after one season following a dispute with coach Giovanni Vavassori. He then signed for Scottish club Dundee, managed by Ivano Bonnetti whom he knew well from their time together in Italy. Quickly becoming Dundee's star player, he was then transferred to Rangers, becoming a fans favourite at Ibrox, after scoring against arch rivals Celtic in a cup final.

In June 2012, he was one of several former professional footballers who agreed to join Wembley to play in their FA Cup campaign for the new season. Caniggia and fellow former-internationals Ray Parlour, Martin Keown, Graeme Le Saux, Jaime Moreno, Danny Dichio and Brian McBride, plus David Seaman (goalkeeping coach) and former England manager Terry Venables (technical advisor), came out of retirement to play for Wembley who were featured in a television documentary as they endeavoured to help the club play at Wembley Stadium. On 12 August 2012, he appeared in a preliminary round of the FA Cup. Aged 45, he scored the first goal in a 3–2 win against Langford.

Career statistics

Club

1 Including appearances in Scottish League Cup.

International career
Caniggia was a key player in both the 1990 and 1994 World Cups, but was not picked under the strict regime of coach Daniel Passarella for France '98.

Caniggia was capped 50 times for Argentina, scoring 16 goals. He played at the 1990 and 1994 World Cups, scoring four goals in eight matches. In Argentina, Caniggia was renowned for excelling for the national team despite not having a high-profile club career nor ever playing for big European teams.  Contrary to popular belief and largely due to loose interpretation, Caniggia was not a pure striker, but rather a playmaker or creative forward.

Caniggia was good friends with Argentina legend  Diego Maradona; the duo once celebrated a goal with a kiss on the lips. Claudio's wife at that time, model Mariana Nannis, said: "At times I believe Diego is in love with my husband. It must be the long hair and big muscles."

1990 World Cup

At the 1990 World Cup, Caniggia scored two key goals to help Argentina reach the final. He came off the bench in the inaugural match against Cameroon in Milan, memorably being fouled three times in a single dribble as he carried the ball forward, the last, by Benjamin Massing earning the Cameroonian a straight red card (Massing kicked Caniggia so hard his own shoe came off). In the subsequent matches, Caniggia was in the starting lineup. In the second round, Argentina faced Brazil in Turin, and with the score 0–0 after 80 minutes, a pass by Diego Maradona left Caniggia one on one against Brazilian goalkeeper Taffarel; Caniggia dribbled past him and scored on the empty goal, giving Argentina the victory and eliminating Brazil from the tournament in what was seen as a huge upset. The goal gave him legendary status among the Argentine fans for knocking out their chief rivals.

Argentina then beat Yugoslavia in Florence on penalty kicks, advancing to the semi-finals, where they played against Italy in Naples. The Italians had not conceded any goals in five matches, and were up 1–0 at half-time. In the second half, Caniggia headed a cross into the net of goalkeeper Walter Zenga, ending his record streak at 517 minutes without conceding a goal, and sending the match into extra time. After no change in the score, penalty kicks were taken, and Argentina won again through this method, advancing to the final. Caniggia had been cautioned in the team's second first round match against the Soviet Union, and then received another yellow card against Italy for deliberately handling the ball, which earned him a suspension. He had to watch the final between his team and West Germany from the stands in Rome, which Argentina lost 1–0.

1991 Copa América, 1992 Confederations Cup and 1993 CONMEBOL–UEFA Cup of Champions

Throughout the 1991 Copa América, Caniggia asserted his dominance and was arguably the most dynamic player; he scored two goals and made four assists in the tournament as Argentina won the title. He also helped Argentina win the 1992 Confederations Cup, in which he scored a goal in the final itself. In February 1993, he scored the goal of the 1–1 tie between Argentina and Denmark in the CONMEBOL–UEFA Cup of Champions, held in Mar del Plata. Argentina finally won by penalties and was declared intercontinental champion.

1994 World Cup
Caniggia scored two goals in the 1994 World Cup, both of them in the first round match against Nigeria, the first from a Gabriel Batistuta free kick rebound and second one from a free kick by Diego Maradona, which he finished, putting the ball in top right hand corner. He was taken out of Argentina's third game against Bulgaria 26 minutes into the match in the boiling heat of Dallas, an Argentine team who were also without Maradona. He was left out of the Argentine squad for the team's Round of 16 match against Romania in Los Angeles; Argentina lost 3–2 and were out of the tournament.

2002 World Cup
After refusing to cut his long hair despite the rules of national coach Daniel Passarella, he was frozen out of the national team for a number of years. He made a brief comeback to the Marcelo Bielsa-coached squad for the 2002 World Cup, but did not play. He received a red card for cursing at the referee from the bench in Argentina's last match against Sweden, becoming the first player to be sent off from the bench in a World Cup.

Style of play
A quick and physically strong striker, with good technique and dribbling skills, Caniggia was known in particular for his exceptional speed as a player; he competed in athletics before his football career, taking part in athletic tournaments at the provincial level, running the 100 meters. In addition to his ability to score goals consistently, he was also equally capable of playing off other forwards, and of creating chances for teammates; as such, he was often deployed in deeper roles as an advanced playmaker or creative forward, or even more frequently out wide as a winger. Due to his explosive running, which enabled him to get past opponents consistently, throughout his career, he was nicknamed El Hijo del Viento ("Son of the Wind") and El Pájaro ("The Bird"). Despite his reputation as one of Argentina's greatest players ever, he was also known to be a controversial player. In addition to his playing ability and goalscoring, Caniggia stood out for his recogniseable long blonde hair.

Personal life
Caniggia was married to Mariana Nannis. They had three children: son Kevin Axel, son Alexander Dimitri, and daughter Charlotte Chantal. In September 2019, Caniggia asked his wife for a divorce and started dating Sofia Bonelli, a 26-year-old Argentine model. In November 2019 he and Bonelli got married in Tulum, Mexico.

Honours
River Plate
Primera División Argentina: 1985–86
Copa Interamericana: 1986

Rangers
Scottish Premier League: 2002–03
Scottish Cup: 2001–02, 2002–03
Scottish League Cup: 2001–02, 2002–03

Argentina
Copa América: 1991
FIFA Confederations Cup: 1992
Artemio Franchi Cup: 1993
Kirin Cup: 1992
FIFA World Cup runner-up: 1990

References

External links

 
 Short biography
 Profile at Argentine Soccer
 
  

1967 births
Living people
Argentine people of Italian descent
People from Hipolito Yrigoyen Partido
Sportspeople from Buenos Aires Province
Argentine footballers
Association football forwards
Club Atlético River Plate footballers
Hellas Verona F.C. players
Atalanta B.C. players
A.S. Roma players
S.L. Benfica footballers
Boca Juniors footballers
Dundee F.C. players
Rangers F.C. players
Qatar SC players
Wembley F.C. players
Argentine Primera División players
Serie A players
Serie B players
Primeira Liga players
Scottish Premier League players
Qatar Stars League players
Argentine sportspeople in doping cases
Doping cases in association football
Argentina international footballers
1987 Copa América players
1989 Copa América players
1990 FIFA World Cup players
1991 Copa América players
1992 King Fahd Cup players
1994 FIFA World Cup players
2002 FIFA World Cup players
Copa América-winning players
Copa Libertadores-winning players
FIFA Confederations Cup-winning players
Argentine expatriate footballers
Argentine expatriate sportspeople in Italy
Argentine expatriate sportspeople in Portugal
Argentine expatriate sportspeople in Scotland
Argentine expatriate sportspeople in Qatar
Argentine expatriate sportspeople in England
Expatriate footballers in Italy
Expatriate footballers in Portugal
Expatriate footballers in Scotland
Expatriate footballers in Qatar
Expatriate footballers in England